Río Hurtado is one of five communes in the Limarí Province of Chile's north-central IV Coquimbo Region.

Administration
As a commune, Río Hurtado is a third-level administrative division of Chile administered by a municipal council, headed by an alcalde who is directly elected every four years. The 2008-2012 alcalde is Gary Valenzuela Rojas.

Within the electoral divisions of Chile, Río Hurtado is represented in the Chamber of Deputies by Pedro Velásquez (Ind.) and Matías Walker (PDC) as part of the 8th electoral district, (together with Coquimbo and Ovalle). The commune is represented in the Senate by Evelyn Matthei Fornet (UDI) and Jorge Pizarro Soto (PDC) as part of the 4th senatorial constituency (Coquimbo Region).

Geography

Demographics
According to data from the 2002 Census of Population and Housing, the Río Hurtado commune had 4,771 inhabitants, all of whom are considered to live in rural areas, making it the least populous commune in the province. The Río Hurtado population represents 0.79% of regional population and 3.1% of the provincial population.

References

External links
 Municipality of Río Hurtado

Communes of Chile
Populated places in Limarí Province